Kyzyl-Köl is a village in Jalal-Abad Region, in Kyrgyzstan. It is part of the Aksy District. Its population was 1,552 in 2021.

References

Populated places in Jalal-Abad Region